Laos competed, officially as the Lao People's Democratic Republic, at the 2012 Summer Paralympics in London, United Kingdom, from August 29 to September 9. It was the country's third participation in the Paralympic Games.

Laos was represented by a single athlete, Eay Simay in powerlifting. Simay took part in his third Paralympics; at the Beijing Games in 2008, he won Laos' first Paralympic medal, a bronze.

Powerlifting

Eay Simay competed in the men's under 48kg event.

See also
Summer Paralympic disability classification
Laos at the Paralympics
Laos at the 2012 Summer Olympics

Notes

Nations at the 2012 Summer Paralympics
2012
Paralympics